"Pink" is a song by American rock band Aerosmith. It was written by Steven Tyler and professional songwriters Richie Supa and Glen Ballard. It was released as the third major single from Nine Lives in 1997.

Composition
The song is highlighted by a harmonica performance by Steven Tyler at the beginning, as well as a strong bass rhythm throughout the song, and a mix of acoustic guitars and jangling electric guitars throughout the verses.

Many of the lines in the verses start with the word "pink" (e.g. "Pink it's my new obsession ", "Pink it's not even a question", "Pink on the lips of your lover"). The song is also highly suggestive, in that the origin of the fascination with pink stems from the admiration of a woman's reproductive organs, particularly the inner side of the outer lips – the "pink in the middle" – and also the man's penis – "I wanna wrap you in rubber" and "my favorite crayon"

Chart positions

The song reached No. 27 on the Billboard Hot 100, No. 38 in the United Kingdom, and No. 19 in Latvia. It also topped the Mainstream Rock Tracks chart for four weeks.

Music video
The music video for the song used CGI to morph characters' faces to other bodies. A variety of random characters mixed in with band members moving towards the camera, morphing into different characters in the process (e.g., Joe Perry as a centaur, Brad Whitford as a little boy, Steven Tyler as a skeleton, and a boy dressed as the Easter Bunny). The video premiered on November 11, 1997, and was directed by Doug Nichol.

Two versions of the music video exist. In the uncensored version, there is a woman dressed in a blue jumpsuit walking towards the camera. For a brief second, the top, unzipped portion of the jumpsuit is pulled away, revealing her right breast. There is another instance where a woman's breasts are briefly fully revealed when a woman, painted blue and green, does a pirouette.

The uncensored version caused minor controversy and several television networks required Nichol to censor the video for daytime airings. As a result, the edited version censored the pirouette scene. The clean version also shows Tyler and Perry presented as a two-headed man and only the coverup portion of the breast reveal scene is present.

Live performances
As of 2007, "Pink" is one of only two songs from Nine Lives consistently played on Aerosmith tours, along with "Falling in Love (Is Hard on the Knees)".

Track listing

Covers and other versions 
A different version of the song, The South Beach Mix, was included on the career-spanning compilation O, Yeah! Ultimate Aerosmith Hits.

Japanese edition of the "Pink" single from 'Nine Lives' features six tracks: three mixes of "Pink" (Album Version, The South Beach Mix & Live from the Howard Stern Radio Show), plus live versions of "Falling In Love (Is Hard On The Knees)" & "Walk This Way" recorded in March 1997. As well, there is a  techno remix of "Falling in Love (Is Hard On The Knees)" titled Moby Fucked Remix.

It is a bonus playable song in the video game Guitar Hero: Aerosmith, and the only track from Nine Lives present in the game.  In the Wii and PlayStation 2 versions of this game, the word "high" (in "Pink gets me high as a kite") is removed.

Janelle Monáe's 2018 single "Pynk" interpolates Aersomith's "Pink," with Steven Tyler and Glen Ballard being credited as co-writers.

Awards
The song won the band their fourth and most recent Grammy award in 1999 for Best Rock Performance by a Duo or Group with Vocal.

Additionally, the video won an MTV Video Music Award for Best Rock Video in 1998.

Certifications

References

Aerosmith songs
1997 songs
1997 singles
Songs written by Glen Ballard
Songs written by Richard Supa
Songs written by Steven Tyler
Song recordings produced by Kevin Shirley
Columbia Records singles